Pacolet Mill Office, also known as Pacolet Municipal Building and Town Hall, is a historic office building located at Pacolet, Spartanburg County, South Carolina. It built in 1908 by the Pacolet Manufacturing Company. It is a one-story, brick building with full-height basement level. It has a low-pitched hip roof with flared eaves and decorative exposed rafter tails.  The roof is clad with clay Spanish tile. The site features a curving cast stone or concrete pergola added some time between 1920 and 1927.  In 2004, the building became the town hall for the Town of Pacolet.

It was listed on the National Register of Historic Places in 2004.

References

External links
Pacolet Mills community website

Office buildings on the National Register of Historic Places in South Carolina
Buildings and structures completed in 1908
Buildings and structures in Spartanburg County, South Carolina
National Register of Historic Places in Spartanburg County, South Carolina
1908 establishments in South Carolina